Leverett may refer to:

Places

United States
Leverett, Illinois, an unincorporated community
Leverett, Massachusetts, a town
Leverett, Mississippi, an unincorporated community
Leverett's Chapel, Texas, an unincorporated community
Leverett's Chapel Independent School District, Texas

Antarctica
Leverett Glacier

People

Given name
Leverett W. Babcock (1840–1906), American politician
Leverett Baldwin (1839–1897), American politician
Leverett Candee (1795–1863}, American businessman, manufacturer, and industrialist
Leverett George DeVeber (1849–1925), Canadian politician
Leverett S. Lyon (1885–1959), American economist
Leverett Saltonstall I (1783–1845), American politician
Leverett Saltonstall (1892–1879), American politician

Surname
Frank Leverett (1859–1943), American geologist
John Leverett (1616–1679), governor of Massachusetts Bay Colony (1673–1679)
John Leverett (1662–1724), seventh president of Harvard College (1708–1724)
Nick Leverett (born 1997), American football player

Other uses
Leverett Circle Connector Bridge, Massachusetts, United States
Leverett House, one of the twelve residential houses of Harvard University, United States
Leverett Street Jail, Massachusetts, United States
Leverett J-function
Buckley–Leverett equation